Green Road is an unincorporated community within Knox County, Kentucky, United States.

References

Unincorporated communities in Knox County, Kentucky
Unincorporated communities in Kentucky